Mwandi District is a district of Zambia, located in Western Province. The capital lies at Mwandi. It was separated from Sesheke District in 2012.

References

Districts of Western Province, Zambia